Soul River (Collection of twelve Novellas and short stories) is a 2012 Georgian book by author Miho Mosulishvili.

Logline
Miho Mosulishvili’s collection comprises twelve very short stories of different styles written at different times and about different topics.

On the cover
On the cover of book is 'Soul River' miniature by Miho Mosulishvili:
If you, weary of the dim, harassing life decide to spend some of your miserable time at the river, it will surely bring along your corpse. But where are you going to be then? Still on the bank or will the Soul River drift you away?

Content	
 The eighth bullet	
 Urakparaki	
 The warrant on the Hat	
 Advantage of a dog	
 Alloplant	
 Etchings of Tbilisi	
 Om mani padme hum or as will shift the world to the condolence	
 Dance with a Rock	
 How I spoke with the Queen of Great Britain	
 Go recognizing with Alan Richard Meechan	
 Sketches from Didgori	
 Yesterday's night

Release details
 2012 — Intelekti Publishing

References

External links
 The Soul River
  Sulis mdinare

Literature of Georgia (country)
2012 short story collections
Works by Miho Mosulishvili